The Ukrainian Lions was a soccer club that was operated by the Ukrainian American Sports Club. The club was based in Chicago, Illinois. It was founded in 1949 by Ukrainians that had settled in the Chicago area after the Second World War. They competed professionally in the Lamar Hunt US Open Cup (National Challenge Cup) and the National Soccer League (Chicago). All their home games were played at Hansen Stadium. There were 6 players from the Ukrainian Lions that played on the US National Team Willy Roy, Nick Krat, Orest Banach, Stefan Szefer, Fred Kovacs and Mike Noha.

In 1975, the Chicago Sting signed Ukrainian Lions players Willy Roy, Stefan Szefer, Richard Greene, Mike Winters, Eugene Andruss and Ian Stone for their inaugural season in the North American Soccer League. Other players that went on to play in the American Soccer League and the  North American Soccer League were Nick Owcharuk in the with the San Diego Sockers, Leo Kulinczenko  with the Los Angeles Skyhawks and Bill Mishalow with the Memphis Rogues. The club stopped operations in 2004.

Honors 
National Soccer League of Chicago Champion: 4
1952-53, 1970–71, 1971–72, 1973–74

Peel Cup: 1
1956

Illinois Governors Cup:3
1972, 1974, 1977

Notable former players
Orest Banach
Mike Noha
Willy Roy
Leo Kulinczenko
Bill Mishalow
Nick Owcharuk
Nick Krat
Ian Stone (soccer)
Eugene Andruss
Mike Winters
Richard Greene (soccer)
Fred Kovacs
Stefan Szefer

Former managers 
1970–1986 Anatoly Hordinskyj
1974–1981 Vadim Mishalow
1969–1970  Orest Klufas

References

External links 
 Футбол – Українська футбольна діаспора 
 Volyanska, M. Founders of the Ukrainian-American Sports Association "Lions" (Будівничі українсько-американського спортового товариства “Леви”). Ukrainian people.
 Pavlosyuk, Z. Ukrainian-American Sports Association "Lions" are champions again! (УАСТ “Леви” – знову чемпіони!). Chas I Podii. 11 June 2009

Soccer clubs in Chicago
Defunct soccer clubs in Illinois
Ukrainian association football clubs outside Ukraine
Association football clubs established in 1949
Ukrainian-American culture in Chicago
1949 establishments in Illinois
2004 disestablishments in Illinois
Association football clubs disestablished in 2004
Diaspora soccer clubs in the United States